Gendarmerie Nationale most commonly refers to:

Gendarmerie Nationale (France)
Gendarmerie Nationale (Belgium), merged with Belgian police in 2001

Gendarmerie Nationale may also refer to:

Gendarmerie Nationale (Algeria)
Gendarmerie Nationale (Benin)
Gendarmerie Nationale (Burkina-Faso)
Gendarmerie Nationale (Burundi)
Gendarmerie Nationale (Cameroon)
Gendarmerie Nationale (Chad)
Gendarmerie Nationale (Gabon)
Gendarmerie Nationale (Madagascar)
Gendarmerie Nationale (Mali)
Gendarmerie Nationale (Mauritania)
Gendarmerie Nationale (Niger)
Gendarmerie Nationale (Senegal)
Gendarmerie Nationale (Togo)

Gendarmerie